Jacques Bossis (born 22 December 1952) is a French former professional road bicycle racer. As an amateur he won Bordeaux-Saintes in 1973. He was professional from 1976 to 1985 and won 7 victories. He wore the yellow jersey as leader of the general classification for one day in the 1978 Tour de France. His victories include 1976 and 1977 editions of the GP Ouest-France, 1981 Tour du Haut-Var. Since 1988 in the commune of Saujon in Charente-Maritime in France, a cycling event called the la Jacques Bossis is organized which counts for the national amateur competition. He also competed in the team pursuit event at the 1972 Summer Olympics.

Major results

1973
Bordeaux-Saintes
1976
GP Ouest-France
1977
GP Ouest-France
1978
Circuit de l'Indre
Cholet-Pays de Loire
 national track pursuit championships
Intermediate sprints classification in the Tour de France
1980
Grand Prix de Fourmies
Nogent-sur-Oise
1981
Plancoët
GP de Peymeinade
Tour du Haut Var

References

External links 

1952 births
Living people
French male cyclists
Sportspeople from Charente-Maritime
Olympic cyclists of France
Cyclists at the 1972 Summer Olympics
French track cyclists
Cyclists from Nouvelle-Aquitaine
21st-century French people
20th-century French people